Vornorexant, also known by its developmental code names ORN-0829 and TS-142, is an orexin antagonist medication which is under development for the treatment of insomnia and sleep apnea. It is a dual orexin OX1 and OX2 receptor antagonist (DORA). The medication is taken by mouth. As of June 2021, vornorexant is in phase 2 clinical trials for insomnia and phase 1 trials for sleep apnea. It is under development by Taisho Pharmaceutical.

Vornorexant has a time to peak of 2.5hours and a relatively short elimination half-life of 1.3 to 3.3hours. It was designed to have a short half-life and duration in order to reduce next-day side effects like somnolence.

See also
 Seltorexant – another investigational short-acting orexin receptor antagonist
 List of investigational sleep drugs § Orexin receptor antagonists

References

External links
 Vornorexant (ORN-0829, TS-142) - AdisInsight

Experimental drugs
Fluoroarenes
Hypnotics
Ketones
Orexin antagonists
Oxazines
Pyrazoles
Pyridines
Triazoles